Big L: The Archives 1996–2000 is a limited-edition CD by the late Harlem hip hop emcee Big L, released on June 28, 2006 with only 500 reported pressings. This album contains many Big L songs that were not released prior to this album's release.

The EP vinyl record A-side from 1996 contains tracks recorded for his second Columbia/SME Records LP, (unreleased to this day), including a "Games Females Play" version without Sadat X and Guru, with two never-before-heard verses by Big L, plus "Can I Hit It" and "Now or Never".  The B-side (1998) features "Platinum Plus" (alternative version), featuring C-TOWN (instead of Big Daddy Kane) and an extra verse by Big L, "Who You Sidin' Wit" (Buckwild remix), without Stan Spit and instead with extra Big L verses, and finally "Furious Anger", produced by Big L and originally released on Shyheim's LP Manchild.

The CD companion to vinyl set, containing seven bonus tracks not on the vinyl releases. "Ebonics Remix"  produced by original beatmaker Ron Browz (formerly known as Rondell) freaked out to an even more frenetic level, adding a verse from 16-year-old T-Rex. It also includes the previously unreleased "We Got This" featuring Mr. Cheeks of Lost Boyz,  "On The Mic", "Size Em Up" Roc Raida remix (previously vinyl-only), "Deadly Combination" featuring The Notorious B.I.G. & 2Pac, "Still Here", "Platinum Plus" Hi-Tek Remix, in addition to a cappellas.

Track listing
 "Games Females Play"
 "Now or Never"
 "Hit It"
 "Platinum Plus" (original Riverside mix)
 "We Got This" (alternative lyrics)
 "Furious Anger" (featuring Shyheim)
 "Deadly Combination" (Remix) (featuring 2Pac & The Notorious B.I.G.)
 "On the Mic" (Roc Raida Turntablist mix)
 "Still Here" (featuring C-Town) (Hi-Tek mix)
 "Ebonics Remix" (featuring T-Rex)
 "Who You Slidin' With" (Buckwild mix)
 "Accapella 1" [Platinum Plus]
 "Accapella 2" [Fall Back]

2006 compilation albums
Archives
Compilation albums published posthumously
Albums produced by Buckwild